Roman of Le Puy, also known as Romanus of Puy, was the first lord of Oultrejordain in the Kingdom of Jerusalem from around 1120 to around 1126. He was a nobleman from Auvergne who accompanied Adhemar de Monteil, Bishop of Le Puy, to the Holy Land during the First Crusade. He signed royal charters during the reign of Baldwin I of Jerusalem. Baldwin I or his successor, Baldwin II of Jerusalem, granted Roman the important fief of Oultrejordain, or its northern region. He was deprived of most of his domains because of a rebellion against Baldwin II. He and his son lost their remaining estates after they were accused of conspiring against Baldwin II's successor, Fulk of Anjou, in the early 1130s.

Early life

Roman was mentioned as Romanus de Podio in written sources between around 1110 and 1133. Modern historians associate Podium with Le Puy-en-Velay in Auvergne. If this identification is correct, Roman was most probably a retainer of Adhemar de Monteil, Bishop of Le Puy. The bishop accompanied Raymond IV, Count of Toulouse, to the Holy Land during the First Crusade.

Royal vassal

Roman was the first known castellan of Ramla in the Kingdom of Jerusalem, appointed before 1107, according to Jonathan Riley-Smith. Hans Eberhard Mayer refutes Riley-Smith's view, emphasizing that no primary source substantiates that Roman held the fortress. Roman signed more than five royal charters from the 1110s. For instance, he was the fourth lay witness of a charter that Baldwin I of Jerusalem issued for the hospital in Jerusalem on 20 June 1112; and he was the last among the witnesses on Baldwin I's charter for the Abbey of St. Mary of the Valley of Jehosaphat in 1114 or 1115.

William of Tyre stated that Roman had been the first lord of Oultrejordain. Either Baldwin I, or Baldwin I's successor, Baldwin II of Jerusalem, granted the territory to him in the late 1110s or early 1120s, according to most historians. Historian Steven Tibble proposes that Roman only held the territory to the north of Wadi Mujib, because the southern region of Oultrejordain remained part of the royal demesne. The seat of the lordship, Krak de Montreal, was built in a fertile valley to the east of the River Jordan at Baldwin I's order in 1115. Montreal and two smaller fortressesli Vaux Moysi near Petra and Ailah on the Red Seastrengthened the defence of the kingdom and secured the control of the caravan routes between Damascus and Egypt.

Baldwin II allegedly dispossessed Roman in or before 1126, because in that year Pagan the Butler was mentioned as lord of Oultrejourdain. According to a widespread scholarly theory, the Etablissement du roi Baudoin de Borca document about the erection of ports and roads without royal permissionwas issued to authorize the king to confiscate Oultrejourdain after Roman's unsuccessful rebellion. Although Roman and his son, Ralph, were deprived of the wealthy lordship, Roman could retain small estates in Samaria. Tibble underlines that no contemporaneous source mentioned a revolt against Baldwin II in 1126. According to William of Tyre, Roman was one of the  discontented noblemen who were accused of conspiring against Baldwin II's son-in-law and successor, Fulk of Anjou, in the early 1130s. As a retaliation, their estates were expropriated.

References

Sources 

 
 
 
 
 
 
 

Christians of the First Crusade
Lords of Oultrejordain